Dániel Vadnai (born 19 February 1988) is a Hungarian football player who  plays for MTK Budapest.

Career
On 3 February 2023, Vadnai returned to MTK Budapest.

Club statistics

Updated to games played as of 10 May 2021.

Debreceni VSC
On 16 August 2013, Vadnai signed a four-year contract with Debreceni VSC.

References

External links
MLSZ 
HLSZ 

1988 births
Footballers from Budapest
Living people
Hungarian footballers
Association football defenders
MTK Budapest FC players
Debreceni VSC players
Mezőkövesdi SE footballers
Nemzeti Bajnokság I players
Nemzeti Bajnokság II players